Charles Dance (born 1946) is an English actor, screenwriter and director.

Charles Dance may also refer to:

Charles Dance (motorist), 19th century motoring pioneer
Charles Dance (playwright) (1794–1863), prolific 19th century playwright